Erman Herman Vardar (born 14 December 2001) is a Swedish footballer of Turkish origin, who plays as a forward.

Career
Vardar made his professional debut for Antalyaspor in a 3-0 Süper Lig win over Yeni Malatyaspor on 18 May 2019.

On September 3, 2019, he has signed with Serik Belediyespor for a season long loan deal.

On 2 February 2021, it was confirmed that Vardar had joined TFF Third League side Somaspor.

References

External links
 
 
 
 Svenskfotboll Profile

Living people
2001 births
Swedish footballers
Association football forwards
Sportspeople from Västra Götaland County
People from Skövde Municipality
Süper Lig players
TFF Second League players
Antalyaspor footballers